Finesville is an unincorporated community and census-designated place (CDP) located within Pohatcong Township in Warren County, New Jersey, United States, that was defined as part of the 2010 United States Census. As of the 2010 Census, the CDP's population was 175.

History
The community is located along the Musconetcong River between Pohatcong Mountain and Musconetcong Mountain, about a mile east of the Delaware River in a section of the Musconetcong Valley called the Musconetcong Gorge. The settlement was named for Philip and John Fein (often misspelled Fine by locals) who settled in the area from Germany. They built a dam and ran an oil mill, gristmill, sawmill, hotel and a store.

The area was first built up as a permanent settlement due to the construction of Chelsea Forge, built in 1751, a charcoal-iron forge on the Musconetcong. The forge helped to provide the Continental Army with weapons to defend Valley Forge. The Shank Brothers ran a ferry across the Delaware River from the point where the Musconetcong empties into it prior to 1800. The Fein gristmill burned and was later rebuilt as the Riegel Paper Corporation's paper mill and became the Taylor Stiles and Company knife factory.

Historic district

The Finesville–Seigletown Historic District is a  historic district encompassing the community along County Route 627 (Riegelsville-Warren Glen Road); Mountain, Musconetcong, Mount Joy and Bellis roads, and extending into Holland Township, Hunterdon County. It was added to the National Register of Historic Places on November 10, 2010, for its significance in architecture, industry, engineering, and exploration/settlement. The district includes 97 contributing buildings, 6 contributing structures, and 5 contributing sites.

The district includes the Seigle Homestead, listed individually on the NRHP in 1977 and located in the Seigletown section of community. There are over twenty early stone houses in the community. Many architectural styles are represented, including Colonial Revival, Gothic Revival, Victorian, and Queen Anne.

Geography
According to the United States Census Bureau, Finesville had a total area of 0.325 square miles (0.841 km2), all of which was land.

Demographics

Census 2010

Places of worship
The Finesville Church was built in 1877. The Finesville United Methodist Church was built in 1879 and displays Greek Revival influences. Both are contributing properties of the historic district.

Transportation

The Mount Joy Road Bridge crosses the Musconetcong River and connects Pohatcong and Holland Townships. This Pratt truss bridge, a contributing structure of the historic district, was built  and is the only known example made by G. M. Russling of Hackettstown.
County Route 627 (Riegelsville-Warren Glen Road) runs northeast-southwest through the community and intersects with Mountain and Mount Joy Roads.

Points of interest
Hunts Meadow – named for patriot Edward Hunt who dug the millrace here and wintered sixty cavalry horses for the Continental Army in 1778.
Seigletown – named for Benjamin Seigle, a Revolutionary militia captain, who lived here and made red clay pottery called Seigleware. The family owned a farm, a gristmill, clovermill, blacksmith shop and hematite mine.

Wineries
 Alba Vineyard
 Villa Milagro Vineyards

See also
 National Register of Historic Places listings in Warren County, New Jersey

References

External links
 

Census-designated places in Warren County, New Jersey
Pohatcong Township, New Jersey